Estadio Olímpico is a multi-use stadium located in the neighbourhood of Cerro in Montevideo, Uruguay.  It is currently used mostly for football matches.  The stadium holds 9,500 people and was built in 1923. It is the home stadium of Rampla Juniors.

References

Buildings and structures completed in 1923
Olimpico (Montevideo)
O
Rampla Juniors
Villa del Cerro